Brunlanes is a parish and former municipality within Larvik municipality in Vestfold county, Norway. It was annexed by Larvik on January 1, 1988.

The administrative centre of the municipality was located in the adjacent villages of Nevlunghavn and Helgeroa. Arguably the best soil in Vestfold County can be found in Brunlanes, and farming is the main industry with considerable vegetable- and corn cultivation. It is home to Berg Old Church at Berg, which was erected in the 1100s, but laid in ruins by the 1960s. The church had been rebuilt and features a clear-cut architecture with a red tilestone roof.

History
The parish of  Brunlagnæs  was established as a municipality January 1, 1838 (see formannskapsdistrikt). Small parts of Brunlanes were moved to Larvik in 1875 and to the neighboring municipality Stavern in 1883, 1938, 1949 and 1969. In 1964 three farms with 12 inhabitants were moved to Porsgrunn in Telemark county. On 1 January 1988 Brunlanes was incorporated into the enlarged Larvik municipality. Before the merger it had a population of 8,138. today Brunlanes constituting the south-western part of Larvik. Villages including Helgeroa and Nevlunghavn are located there. Its area is 188 km2.

There are large areas of good agricultural within Brunlanes. The area is  known for strawberry cultivation. Brunlanes is also known for forestry and wood processing industry.  There are many historical relics in Brunlanes, including many burial mounds from the Iron Age and Bronze Age. The large moraine runs into the ocean at  far southwestern Brunlanes.

The name
Until 1879 the name was written "Brunlagnæs" (with variations), and in the period 1879-1888 "Brunlanæs". The form "Brunlanes" was settled in 1889.
The Old Norse form of the name was just Nesjar, the plural form of nes n 'headland'. But the parish (and the municipality) was later named after the old farm Brunla. The first element in this name is probably brunnr m 'well', or brún f 'edge; steep slope'. The last element is lá f 'meadow near the water'.

Brunlanes parish
Brunlanes Parish in Larvik (Brunlanes prestegjeld) includes Tanum Church (Tanum kirke) in Brunlanes, Kjose church (Kjose kirke) at Farris, Berg wood church (Berg trekirke) and Berg stone church (Berg steinkirke).

Berg stone church  (Berg steinkirke) was  built of brick in ca. 1100. The old medieval church was partially demolished in 1882, after Berg trekirke had been built on the site in 1878. The remains of the walls  were preserved and from 1965 to 1970, the church was restored partly with the original stone. The church has conservation status protected.

Recreation
Brunlanes has Vestfold’s longest coastal hiking trails. The main trail begins at the bay Ødegårdsbukta in the west and goes through Helgeroa on its way to Mølen Geopark. Along the trail are various beaches, campsites, and unique coastal landscapes. The trail from Mølen to Nevlunghavn is 3.5 kilometers and passes by Nevlungstranda Nature Preserve. The trail continues from Nevlunghavn to Løvallodden and later Guslandsmarka. The last section of the trail leads from Gusland to the beach Nalumstranda in the innermost parts of the Naver Fjord. The trailhead is located at Hummerbakken Nature Preserve by the Hummerbakk Fjord. The 8 kilometers from Nalumstranda to Stavern leads through beaches, coastal landscapes, forests, and slopes of naked rocks on its way to Røvika. It also leads by the home of the artist Odd Nerdrum. There are panoramic views at Rakke of nearby areas such as Røvika in the west and Skagerak in the south. There are also remains of World War II fortifications here such as concrete gun pits. The trail ends at Fredriksvern Verft in Stavern, a former naval base with buildings dated to the 17th century.

Gallery

References

External links
Den Evangelisk Lutherske Frikirke, Brunlanes

Populated places disestablished in 1988
Former municipalities of Norway
Larvik